Novi Iskar is a town in Western Bulgaria, located in Sofia City Province, which is a part of the Municipality of Sofia (the capital of Bulgaria). 
It is often regarded as a northern suburb of Bulgarian capital Sofia and lies in the northern part of the Sofia Valley, with the Iskar Gorge beginning just north of the town.

The town of Novi Iskar was formed in May 1974 with the merging of 3 villages: Aleksandar Voykov, Gnilyane and Kurilo. The village of Aleksandar Voykov was formed in 1955 when the Kumaritsa and Slavovtsi villages were merged. Initially a villa area, Izgrev is nowadays a district of the town.

Today, Novi Iskar consists of 5 districts: Slavovtsi, Kumaritsa, Kurilo, Izgrev and Gnilyane.

Honour 
Cape Kurilo in Snow Island, South Shetland Islands is named after the district of Kurilo.

External links 
 www.weather-webcam.eu - Online webcam from Novi Iskar
 http://www.noviiskar.bg/ - Novi Iskar web-based community media for local news from the town of Novi Iskar and Sofia

Districts of Sofia
Towns in Bulgaria
Populated places in Sofia City Province